Simon Gegenheimer is a German cross-country mountain biker. He competes in the cross-country, cross-country eliminator, and cross-country marathon events. He won the German national championship in the cross-country eliminator in 2012, 2013, and 2016. In 2016 he won the silver medal in the cross-country eliminator at the world championships in Nové Město na Moravě, Czech Republic. He also won the 2017 UCI XCE World Cup.

References

German male cyclists
Cross-country mountain bikers
Living people
1988 births
People from Enzkreis
Sportspeople from Karlsruhe (region)
German mountain bikers
Cyclists from Baden-Württemberg